Thomas Alan Keith (December 21, 1946 – October 30, 2011) was a radio personality who worked for Minnesota Public Radio in St. Paul, Minnesota. He was the engineer for Garrison Keillor when the latter began his early morning radio show from the St. John's University, Collegeville, Minnesota studio. Keillor wanted dialogue during the program and Keith was about the only other person around at that early hour. Keith was one of the primary sound effects performers for the radio show A Prairie Home Companion and was often an actor in sketches written by Keillor. Keillor created the persona of Jim Ed Poole for Keith on the old early morning show. Jim Ed was said to have grown up in West St. Paul, Minnesota and graduated from Henry Sibley High School.

After serving in the Marine Corps, Keith earned a degree from the University of Minnesota. When production of the radio program moved to St. Paul, Tom Keith continued to play Jim Ed who lived in the Hotel Transom with his pet chicken, Curtis. When Keillor left the morning program, Keith was joined on The Morning Show by Dale Connelly. He maintained the Jim Ed Poole persona and developed several other characters (like Dr. Larry Kyle of Genway Laboratories and B. Marty Barry the self-described "bottomless well of wellness") in cooperation with Connelly. Keith developed his vocal and sound effects skills on the morning program and later on A Prairie Home Companion.

On October 15, 2008, Keith announced his intention to retire on December 11. The Morning Show was discontinued after a final live performance at the Fitzgerald Theater in St. Paul that morning.

Death
Minnesota Public Radio announced that Keith died October 30, 2011, at his home due to a massive pulmonary embolism. He was 64 years old.

See also

References

1946 births
2011 deaths
American Public Media
American radio personalities
Minnesota Public Radio people
People from Saint Paul, Minnesota
United States Marines
University of Minnesota alumni